Michael Lambert may refer to:

Michael J. Lambert (born 1944), Professor of psychology
Michael Lambert (volleyball) (born 1974), American volleyball player
Michael Lambert (snowboarder) (born 1986), Canadian snowboarder
Mick Lambert, English footballer

See also
Michel Lambert, French singing master, theorbist and composer